Laisenia Raura, sometimes called Laisenia Naioko (born 14 October 1990) is a Fijian footballer who plays as a midfielder for Suva in the Fiji National Football League.

Club career
Raura began his football career with Ba F.C.in 2009. In 2018 he moved to Suva F.C.. In 2020 he switched back to Ba.

International career
Raura made his debut for the Fiji national football team on 10 November 2015 in a 2-1 loss against Vanuatu. In 2016 he was a member of the Fijian squad for the 2016 OFC Nations Cup.

In March2019 he was suspended after being red-carded in a match against New Caledonia, and so missed Fiji's friendly match against the Mauritius national football team.

References

External links

1990 births
Living people
Fijian footballers
Ba F.C. players
Association football midfielders
Fiji international footballers
2016 OFC Nations Cup players